Downers Grove Main Street (also known as Downers Grove  or Main Street) is one of three railroad stations on Metra's BNSF Line in Downers Grove, Illinois. The station is at Main Street,  from Union Station, the east end of the line. As of 2018, Downers Grove Main Street is the sixth busiest of Metra's 236 non-downtown stations, with an average of 2,492 weekday boardings. The local police department and library are nearby. Parking lots are managed by the Village of Downers Grove.

The station has connections to multiple Pace Buses, including the Commuter Shuttle lines.

This station was the site of the 1947 Zephyr train wreck that killed 3 and injured more than 30.

The station went under a $1.1 million platform replacement project, which finished in the summer of 2015.

Many trains on the BNSF run express to or from Downers Grove. This is common during the morning and evening rush hours, in an effort to get passengers to the busier stations quicker.

Bus connections
Pace Bus

 834 Joliet/Downers Grove

References

External links

Image of Westbound Train @ Downers Grove/Main Street (Metra Railfans)
1949 Photo of Station (DigitalPast.org)
Downer's Grove-Main Street Crossing (Mike's Railroad Crossing Website)
Station from Main Street from Google Maps Street View

Metra stations in Illinois
Former Chicago, Burlington and Quincy Railroad stations
Main Street
Railway stations in DuPage County, Illinois
Railway stations in the United States opened in 1911